The following is a list of episodes for Amatsuki, which had been released on Japanese television. The animation was produced by Studio Deen and the music production was done by Frontier Works. The story follows an ordinary high school student, Tokidoki Rikugō, who takes supplementary history classes to boost his failing grade at a virtual reality museum which is a simulation of Edo in the Bakumatsu period. The anime only covers the first 24 chapters of the manga.

Episodes

See also

References
General

Specific

External links
Official website 

Amatsuki